Michelle Asha Cooper (born January 3 in Charleston, South Carolina) is the Deputy Assistant Secretary for Higher Education Programs and Acting Assistant Secretary for Postsecondary Education in the U.S. Department of Education. She previously served as president of the Institute for Higher Education Policy (IHEP), a Washington, D.C.-based independent, non-profit organization.

Life and career

Before joining IHEP, Cooper served as the deputy director for the Advisory Committee on Student Financial Assistance (Advisory Committee) at the U.S. Department of Education. Prior to the Advisory Committee, she worked at the Association of American Colleges and Universities, Council of Independent Colleges, and King's College.

Cooper is a member of the board of directors for the Washington Center for Internships & Academic Seminars and the College of Charleston's Foundation Board.  She has previously served on the boards of uAspire, the College of Charleston Alumni Board, and the National College Access Network.

Cooper sits on several advisory boards, including the Bill & Melinda Gates Foundation's Postsecondary Value Commission, Bipartisan Policy Commission's  Reauthorization of the Higher Education Act Task Force, and the American Council on Education's Global Attainment and Inclusion Network. She has previously served on advisory boards for the Lumina Foundation, CEOs for Cities' Talent Dividend Prize, the International Rankings Expert Group, the National Commission on Asian American and Pacific Islander Research in Education, and the Southern Association of Colleges and Schools Commission on Colleges.

On February 3, 2021, Cooper was named Deputy Assistant Secretary within the Office of Postsecondary Education at the U.S. Department of Education and designated as Acting Assistant Secretary for Postsecondary Education.

Awards and recognition
Cooper was awarded an honorary degree from the College of Charleston in 2017 and the Distinguished Alumna Award in 2016.

Cooper was selected to participate in the Aspen Institute's Presidential Leadership Fellowship, College Excellence Program in 2016.

In 2014, the Center for Nonprofit Advancement recognized Cooper with the Excellence in Chief Executive Leadership (EXCEL) award, for her achievements in nonprofit leadership and management.

Diverse: Issues in Higher Education magazine named Cooper “25 to Watch” in its special 25th anniversary issue featuring 25 up-and-coming higher education leaders.  The publication also celebrated Cooper in its first-ever issue.

Politic365 named Cooper one of its 2011 "Game Changers".

Cooper is also the recipient of the 2010 University of Maryland College of Education's Outstanding Young Alumni Award and the 2002 National Education Association's Excellence in the Academy New Scholar Award.

In 2010, Essence magazine selected Cooper as a "powerful visionary" while celebrating Black women under 40 who are trailblazers.

Higher ed expert in the media
Cooper has provided commentary to various media outlets including C-SPAN, and NPR as well as The Chronicle of Higher Education, The Hill, Huffington Post, Inside Higher Ed, USA Today, and Washington Post.

She co-authored Becoming a Student-Ready College: A New Culture of Leadership for Student Success, which reverses the college readiness conversation to offer a new paradigm on institutional value-add in boosting student outcomes.

Education
Cooper received her B.A. from the College of Charleston, M.P.S. from Cornell University, and Ph.D. from the University of Maryland, College Park.

References

External links
 Institute for Higher Education Policy
 National College Access Network
 Recommitting to Educational Opportunity, Forbes, March 22, 2010

American educational theorists
Living people
Cornell University alumni
Year of birth missing (living people)